Loren Stokes (born November 12, 1983) is an American professional basketball player from Buffalo, New York. He was a combo guard at Hofstra University from the 2003–04 season to 2006–07. He is 6'3" and weighs 175 lbs. Stokes is one of six players in Hofstra Pride history to score at least 2,000 points, amassing 2,148 points over his four-year career. A three time first team CAA player, 2004-05 all defensive CAA player, and 2006-07 CAA player of the year, Stokes was eligible for the 2007 NBA Draft, he went undrafted. He was offered an invitation to play for the Orlando Magic in the NBA's summer league. Stokes was playing basketball in Cyprus for APOEL, for whom he was averaging 14.4 points per game. He has also played in Belgium and Ukraine. In early 2011, Stokes signed with the Bay Hawks and in 2012 he was traded to the Canton Charge for Keith McLeod, but was later waived due to personal issues. Loren Stokes is also the brother of Leonard Stokes who played basketball for the University of Cincinnati.

Tony Skinn incident
In the final minute of a 2006 CAA tournament game, George Mason player Tony Skinn threw a punch into Stokes' groin. Skinn was later suspended for George Mason's first round NCAA Tournament game against Michigan State. Later, Skinn was Stokes' teammate during the summer league.

References

External links
ESPN.com: Hofstra Pride - Loren Stokes Player Card
Hofstra Men's Basketball - Loren Stokes Profile

1983 births
Living people
American expatriate basketball people in Belgium
American expatriate basketball people in Cyprus
American expatriate basketball people in Italy
American expatriate basketball people in Ukraine
American men's basketball players
Andrea Costa Imola players
APOEL B.C. players
Basketball players from Buffalo, New York
BC Odesa players
Erie BayHawks (2008–2017) players
Hofstra Pride men's basketball players
Okapi Aalstar players
Point guards
Shooting guards